Arasanj-e Qadim (also Romanized as Ārāsanj-e Qadīm; also known as Ārāsanj, Ārāsanj-e Pā’īn, and Ārāsanj-e Soflá) is a village in Zahray-ye Pain Rural District, in the Central District of Buin Zahra County, Qazvin Province, Iran. At the 2006 census, its population was 670, in 139 families.

References 

Populated places in Buin Zahra County